Inosine-5'-monophosphate dehydrogenase 2, also known as IMP dehydrogenase 2, is an enzyme that in humans is encoded by the IMPDH2 gene.

Function 

IMP dehydrogenase 2 is the rate-limiting enzyme in the de novo guanine nucleotide biosynthesis. It is thus involved in maintaining cellular guanine deoxy- and ribonucleotide pools needed for DNA and RNA synthesis. IMPDH2 catalyzes the NAD-dependent oxidation of inosine-5'-monophosphate into xanthine-5'-monophosphate, which is then converted into guanosine-5'-monophosphate. IMPDH2 has been identified as an intracellular target of the natural product sanglifehrin A

Clinical significance 

This gene is up-regulated in some neoplasms, suggesting it may play a role in malignant transformation.

See also 
 IMP dehydrogenase

References

Further reading

EC 1.1.1